Mount Wordie is a 4,700+ foot (1,433+ meter) mountain summit located in Glacier Bay National Park and Preserve, in the Alsek Ranges of the Saint Elias Mountains, in southeast Alaska. Although modest in elevation, relief is significant as the mountain rises up from tidewater in less than two miles. Precipitation runoff from the mountain drains into Glacier Bay Basin. Weather permitting, Mount Wordie can be seen from Queen Inlet and Wachusett Inlet of Glacier Bay, which is a popular destination for cruise ships.

Etymology

The mountain was named by members of a 1941 Glacier Bay expedition for James Mann Wordie (1889-1962), a Scottish polar explorer, glacier geologist, and President of the Royal Geological Society from 1951 through 1954. Wordie visited nearby Muir Glacier in Glacier Bay in 1913.

Climate

Based on the Köppen climate classification, Mount Wordie Peak has a subarctic climate with cold, snowy winters, and mild summers. Winter temperatures can drop below −20 °C with wind chill factors below −30 °C. The months May through June offer the most favorable weather for viewing or climbing the peak.

See also

List of mountain peaks of Alaska
Geography of Alaska

References

External links
 Weather forecast: Mount Wordie

Wordie
Wordie
Wordie
Wordie
Wordie